The 2014–15 Pepperdine Waves women's basketball team will represent Pepperdine University in the 2014–15 college basketball season. The Waves, members of the West Coast Conference, are led by second year coach Ryan Weisenberg. The Waves play their home games at the Firestone Fieldhouse on the university campus in Malibu, California. They finished the season 8–22, 3–15 in WCC play to finish in ninth place. They lost in the first round of the WCC women's tournament to Loyola Marymount.

Roster

Schedule

|-
!colspan=9 style="background:#FF6200; color:#0021A5;"| Exhibition

|-
!colspan=9 style="background:#0021A5; color:#FF6200;"| Non-conference Regular Season

|-
!colspan=9 style="background:#0021A5; color:#FF6200;"| WCC Regular Season

|-
!colspan=9 style="background:#FF6200;"| 2015 WCC Tournament

Rankings

References

Pepperdine
Pepperdine Waves women's basketball seasons
Pepperdine
Pepperdine